This is a list of notable people from Libya.

Businesspeople

Educators and teachers 
Carneades Hellenistic Academic Skeptic Philosopher
Aristippus  Ancient Greek philosopher, founder of Cyrenaicism
Lacydes of Cyrene,  Academic Skeptic philosopher, was head of the Platonic Academy at Athens
Zuhra Ramdan Agha Al-Awji
Mohammed Shegewi (died 2007)

Extrajudicial prisoners of the United States 
Omar Khalifa Mohammed Abu Bakr
Omar Deghayes
Muhammad Abd Allah Mansur Al Futuri
Abdel Hamid Ibn Abdussalem Ibn Mifta Al Ghazzawi
Salem Abdul Salem Ghereby
Abu Yahia al-Libi
Abdul Rauf Omar Mohammed Abu Al Qusin
Ashraf Salim Abd Al Salam Sultan
Ibrahim Mahdy Achmed Zeidan

Lawyers 
Kamel Maghur (1935–2002)

Linguists
Ibn al-Ajdābī (died after c. 1077), scholar and linguist
Kalifa Tillisi (1930–2010), historian, translator, and linguist
Ali Fahmi Khushaim (1937–2011), philosopher, historian, and linguist

Musicians 
Nadia Ali (born 3 August 1980), singer-songwriter
Ahmed Fakroun, singer, composer and producer
Nasser el-Mizdawi (born 1950), singer, guitarist and composer

Politicians 

Muammar Gaddafi, (died 2011)
Wahbi al-Bouri, foreign minister
Abdul Salam al-Buseiri, foreign minister
Mohieddin Fikini, foreign minister
Abdul Majid Kubar, foreign minister
Hussein Maziq, foreign minister
Mahmud al-Muntasir, foreign minister
Umar Mustafa al-Muntasir, foreign minister
Muhammad Sakizli, foreign minister
Abdel Rahman Shalgham, foreign minister
Jadallah Azzuz at-Talhi, foreign minister
Hassan Tatanaki, 
 Dr. Ali Abdulsalam Treki
 Shams Al-Deen Bin Omran, foreign minister
Abdulrahman Sewehli

Defence ministers 
Omar Faiek Shennib, Minister of Defence, 1951–1953 (death)

Prime ministers 
Abdul Qadir al-Badri, Prime Minister of Libya (July 2, 1967 – October 25, 1967)
Abdul Hamid al-Bakkoush
Abuzed Omar Dorda
Mohieddin Fikini
Mustafa Ben Halim
Abdessalam Jalloud
Mahmoud Jibril
Mahmud Sulayman al-Maghribi
Baghdadi Mahmudi
Muhammad Ahmad al-Mangoush
Hussein Maziq
Mahmud al-Muntasir
Umar Mustafa al-Muntasir
Abdul Ati al-Obeidi
Wanis al-Qaddafi
Abdul Majid al-Qa′ud
Muhammad az-Zaruq Rajab
Muhammad Osman Said
Muhammad Sakizli
Imbarek Shamekh
Jadallah Azzuz at-Talhi

Physicians
Hani Shennib MD
 Ehtuish Ehtuish
 Alaa Murabit

Religious figures
Abd As-Salam Al-Asmar
Sharif El Gariani
Simon of Cyrene
Ahmad Zarruq
Pope Victor I 
Lucius of Cyrene
Arius

Saint Hadrian
Jason of Cyrene

Resistance leaders 
Sulaiman al-Barouni (1872–1940), resistance leader against Italian colonization
Omar al-Mukhtar (1862–1931), Libyan hero and resistance leader under against Italian colonization
Sayyid Ahmed Sharif es Senussi, Libyan resistance leader and chief of the Senussi order
Ramadan Sewehli (1879–1920), Libyan resistance leader and the founder of Tripolitanian Republic
Omar Shegewi (unknown-1928), libyan resistance fighter who was sentenced to death was married to

Royalty 
Idris I of Libya, King of Libya (1951–1969) and the Chief of the Senussi Muslim order
Queen Fatima (1918–2009), former queen of Libya
Sayyid Hassan ar-Rida
Sayyid Ahmed Sharif es Senussi, Chief of the Senussi Muslim order
Sayyid Muhammad bin 'Ali as-Senussi

Rulers 
Battaros, legendary Libyan king
Shoshenq I, founder of the Twenty-second Dynasty of Egypt.
Shoshenq II, pharaoh of the Twenty-second Dynasty of Egypt.
Osorkon the Elder, fifth king of the twenty-first dynasty of Ancient Egypt and was the first Pharaoh of Libyan origin
Osorkon The Elder, first Libyan king of Egypt and founder of the Libyan Dynasty in face  actually nearly all of the 22, 23, 24 dynasties in ancient Egypt were ruled by Libyans
Siamun the sixth pharaoh of Egypt
Septimius Severus (146–211), 21st Roman Emperor (193–211), born in Libya
Geta, shared his brother Caracalla the throne of Rome before he was murdered in 211
Caracalla 23rd Caesar of Rome, son of Septimius Severus
Ahmed Karamanli (1686–1745), pasha (ruler) of Tripolitania (1711–1745)
Yusuf Karamanli (died 1838), pasha of Tripolitania (1795–1832)
Idris I of Libya (1890–1983), King of Libya (1951–1969).
Umar Mihayshi (died 1984), Libyan army officer
Muammar Gaddafi (1942–2011), Libyan leader (1969–2011).
Mustafa Abdul Jalil (born 1952), former Minister of Justice, and President of the National Transitional Council (5 March 2011 – 8 August 2012)
Zentani Muhammad az-Zentani

Scientists and mathematicians 
Eratosthenes (276 BC–194 BC), Hellenistic mathematician, geographer and astronomer, born in Libya
Theodorus of Cyrene (c. 5th century BC), mathematician

Sportspeople

Basketball 
Suleiman Ali Nashnush (died 1991)

Footballers 
Samir Aboud
Luis de Agustini
Muhammed Alsnany
Akram Ayyad
Mansour Al Borki
Ehab Al Bousefi
Omar Daoud
Meftah Ghazalla
Osama Al Hamady
Khaled Hussein
Abdesalam Kames
Nader Kara
Abdusalam Khames
Ahmed Faraj El Masli
Waled Mhadeb
Rabe Al Msellati
Jehad Muntasser
Arafa Nakuaa
Walid Ali Osman
Ali Rahuma
Marei Al Ramly
Salem Ibrahim Al Rewani
Alejandro Ruben
Hesham Shaban
Mohmoud Maklouf Shafter
Younes Al Shibani
Naji Shushan
Abdulnaser Slil
Tarik El Taib
Reda Al Tawrghe
Mohamed Zubya
Ahmed Mahmoud Zuway

Writers 
Philostephanus, Hellenistic writer
Callimachus, ancient poet and librarian
Eugammon of Cyrene, flourished 567/6 BC.
Ahmed Rafiq Almhadoui (1898–1961), poet
Saddeka Arebi (died 2007), author and anthropologist
Daif Al-Ghazal (1976–2005), writer and journalist who was murdered in 2005
Ibrahim Al-Koni (born 1948)
Hisham Matar (born 1970)
Ahmed Fouad Shennib (died 2007), poet and Minister of Culture and Education

Filmmakers 
Don Coscarelli, horror film director
Maysoon Shaladi, British actress, model, TV presenter, Big Brother UK contestant

References